Thysanoptyx oblonga is a moth of the subfamily Arctiinae first described by Arthur Gardiner Butler in 1877. It is found on Peninsular Malaysia, Sumatra, Java and Borneo. The habitat consists of lowland dipterocarp forests.

References

Lithosiina